Bloch's Principle is a philosophical principle in mathematics
stated by André Bloch.

Bloch states the principle in Latin as: Nihil est in infinito quod non prius fuerit in finito, and explains this as follows:  Every proposition in whose statement the actual infinity occurs can be always considered a consequence, almost immediate, of a proposition where it does not occur, a proposition in finite terms.

Bloch mainly applied this principle to the theory of functions of a complex variable.  Thus, for example, according to this principle, Picard's theorem corresponds to Schottky's theorem, and Valiron's theorem corresponds to Bloch's theorem.

Based on his Principle, Bloch was able to predict or conjecture several
important results such as the Ahlfors's Five Islands theorem,
Cartan's theorem on holomorphic curves omitting hyperplanes, Hayman's result that an exceptional set of radii is unavoidable in Nevanlinna theory.

In the more recent times several general theorems were proved which can be regarded as rigorous statements in the spirit of the Bloch Principle:

Zalcman's lemma

A family  of functions meromorphic on the unit disc  is not normal if and only if there exist:
 a number 
 points  
 functions 
 numbers 
such that 
spherically uniformly on compact subsets of  where  is a nonconstant meromorphic function on 

Zalcman's lemma may be generalized to several complex variables. First, define the following:

For every function  of class  define at each point  a Hermitian form

and call it the Levi form of the function  at 

If function  is holomorphic on  set

This quantity is well defined since the Levi form  is nonnegative for all 
In particular, for  the above formula takes the form

and  coincides with the spherical metric on 

The following characterization of normality can be made based on Marty's theorem, which states that a family is normal if and only if the spherical derivatives are locally bounded:

Brody's lemma

Let X be a compact complex analytic manifold, such that every holomorphic map from the complex plane
to X is constant. Then there exists a metric on X such that every holomorphic map from the unit disc with the Poincaré metric to X does not increase distances.

References

Mathematical principles
Philosophy of mathematics